Given to the Wild is the third studio album by English indie rock band The Maccabees. The album was first released in the United Kingdom on 9 January 2012, where it debuted at number four on the UK Albums Chart and number thirty-one on the Irish Albums Chart. The album has seen four single releases: "Pelican" (released on 30 December 2011), "Feel to Follow" (4 March 2012), "Went Away" (28 May 2012), and "Ayla" (10 September 2012).

Reception
Metacritic has calculated a Metascore of 69 out of 100 for the album, based on 20 reviews, giving the album "generally favourable reviews". NME gave the album a 9/10.
 The album was nominated for the 2012 Mercury Prize.

Recording
The band worked on the 13-track album, their third, at Rockfield Studios with Tim Goldsworthy and Bruno Ellingham (LCD Soundsystem, Massive Attack) over late 2010 to 2011. They also worked on large parts of the record with producer Jag Jago at their rehearsal space in London's Elephant and Castle district before decamping to Suffolk to finish the record at Decoy Studios with Cenzo Townshend and Sean Julliard.

The band have said they took inspiration from "disparate musical peers" such as The Stone Roses, Kate Bush and David Bowie during the recording of the LP, which is the follow-up to 2009's Wall of Arms.

Speaking about the title of the album, singer Orlando Weeks told the NME:
"'Given to the wild' is the first line on the album and was a title idea we had pretty early on. But it wasn't until we'd finished recording that we could come back to it and know that it suited, it just felt right."

Singles
 "Pelican" was released as the album's lead single on 30 December 2011. The song entered the UK Singles Chart at number 87. It appeared in the video game Forza Horizon.
 "Feel to Follow" was released on 3 February 2012. The song peaked to number 188 on the UK Singles Chart.
 "Went Away", the third single from Given to the Wild, was released on 28 May 2012.
 "Ayla" was the fourth single to be released on 10 September 2012.

Other songs
 The song "Unknow" appeared in the 2012 video games Sleeping Dogs and Need for Speed: Most Wanted.
 The song "Give to the Wild (Intro)" appeared in Series 21 - Episode 6 of Top Gear
 The song "Grew Up at Midnight" appeared at the end of the final scene in the film Steve Jobs.

Track listing 
All tracks are written by The Maccabees.

Personnel
Credits adapted from Tidal.

The Maccabees
 Orlando Weeks – vocals , guitar 
 Felix White – guitar  
 Hugo White – guitar 
 Rupert Jarvis – bass guitar 
 Sam Doyle - drums 

Technical
 Felix White – production 
 Hugo White – production 
 Orlando Weeks – production 
 Rupert Jarvis – production 
 Sam Doyle – production 
 Bruno Ellingham , recording engineer 
 Tim Goldsworthy , recording engineer 
 Prabjote Osahn - recording engineer 
 Tom Dalgety - assistant recording engineer 
 John Davis - mastering engineer 
 Sean Juilliard - assistant engineer 
 Cenzo Townshend - mixer 

Additional musicians
 Jack Birchwood - horn 
 Nick Carter -  horn 
 Tom Stone -  horn 
 Darren Morris - piano 
 Will White - keyboards 
 Prabjote Osahn - string arranger , violin 

Artwork
 Andy Goldsworthy – cover photo
 Go De Jong – design, layout
 Tom Oxley - inlay photography

Chart performance
On 12 January 2012 Given to the Wild entered the Irish Albums Chart at number 31.

References

2012 albums
The Maccabees (band) albums
Albums recorded at Rockfield Studios